Black Widow (Yelena Belova; Russian: Еле́на Бело́ва) is a fictional character appearing in American comic books published by Marvel Comics. She is depicted as a spy and was the second modern-era character to use the Black Widow name. She first appeared in Inhumans #5 (March 1999) and was created by Devin Grayson and J.G. Jones. She was trained as a spy and assassin in the Red Room. Originally, Yelena was a foe of Natasha Romanova and was sent to kill her, but the two later became allies. She was also a member of S.H.I.E.L.D., Vanguard, and HYDRA; the latter organization changed her into a version of Super-Adaptoid. As Super-Adaptoid, she was one of the members of the High Council of A.I.M. She reverted to her original codename. Black Widow, in 2017. She is the first confirmed asexual character in the Marvel Universe.

Florence Pugh portrays the character in the Marvel Cinematic Universe film Black Widow, the miniseries Hawkeye (both 2021), and the upcoming film Thunderbolts (2024).

Publication history
Belova, the second modern Black Widow after Natasha Romanova (Natasha Romanoff), was initially a Russian spy of the GRU. She debuted briefly in Inhumans (Vol. 2) #5 (March 1999), and was fully introduced in the 1999 Marvel Knights mini-series Black Widow. A second miniseries also titled Black Widow featuring Natasha Romanoff and Daredevil followed in 2001. The next year, she did a solo turn in her own three-issue miniseries, Black Widow: Pale Little Spider under the mature audience Marvel MAX imprint. The storyline by writer Greg Rucka and artist Igor Kordey was a flashback to her taking on the mantle of the second modern Black Widow.

Fictional character biography
Belova is an amoral spy and assassin who was trained at the Red Room by the same spymasters who trained Natasha Romanoff, the first Black Widow. Yelena was born in Moscow, Soviet Russia; at the age of 15 she was recruited by the GRU. After the death of her trainer, Pyotr Vasilievich Starkovsky, she is activated as the new Black Widow and deployed to investigate. She apprehends and eliminates his killer, unaware that both his murder and the investigation were part of a ploy to get Belova to assert herself as the new Black Widow. Believing herself to be the rightful successor to the "Black Widow" title, Yelena enthusiastically volunteers for a mission that will put her at odds with Natasha, although the meeting and confrontations between the two do not lead to a decisive battle. Natasha refers to Yelena as "little one" and "russkaya", meaning "Russian", and encourages her to find what makes her unique and her personal identity rather than blindly devote herself to nation. Natasha later subjects Yelena to a cruel but necessary manipulation to shatter her illusions about the "Black Widow" title and teach her the reality of the espionage industry. Belova eventually retires to Cuba, where she becomes a successful businesswoman and model.

She is lured back, however, by the espionage agency S.H.I.E.L.D., and becomes involved in the agency's vibranium mining in the Antarctic Savage Land. Shortly afterward, she barely survives an attack by Sauron, receiving severe burns and being subsequently approached with an offer for revenge against S.H.I.E.L.D. and the New Avengers.

Belova is genetically altered by the terrorist organization HYDRA, as she had suffered debilitating and disfiguring injuries after her last encounter with the New Avengers in the Savage Land. HYDRA recruited her with the prospect of revenge and after hiring the services of A.I.M. transferred her mind into a new version of Super-Adaptoid. This body appeared as Belova had originally until it began to absorb powers, at which time it changed as the original did, though now yellow in color. Now equipped with the ability to copy all of the New Avengers' powers, she engages the superhero team in combat. She is eventually defeated by a combination of Tony Stark's 49 successive Iron Man armors—from the first, Tales of Suspense #39, to the then-current—and the Sentry's use of his Void persona, which she absorbs with the rest of the Sentry's powers and energy. When she is defeated, HYDRA disables her using a remote self-destruct mechanism they had implanted in her, rather than let her reveal intelligence to the New Avengers.

She has returned working with a vigilante group, the Vanguard.

During the Dark Reign storyline, Quasimodo researched Yelena Belova for Norman Osborn. Yelena Belova appeared to join Osborn's Thunderbolts. However it was eventually revealed to be actually Natasha Romanova in disguise, acting as a double agent for Nick Fury. She believed she was disguised as Belova on Fury's behalf, planted for Osborn to find and invite into the Thunderbolts. However, Osborn revealed to her that he had tricked her into taking on Belova's appearance in order to get her to do his dirty work. After Natasha's escape from the Thunderbolts, Osborn then revealed the true Yelena in stasis to Scourge and warned him that she could be his replacement on the team.

The real Yelena is later freed from stasis by members of A.I.M. who install the female Adaptoid on the High Council of A.I.M. (alongside Andrew Forson, Graviton, Jude the Entropic Man, Mentallo, Superia, and an undercover Taskmaster) as the Minister of State in Bagalia (a country populated by supervillains).

After the death of the original Black Widow at the hands of Captain America's Hydra doppelganger then defeat at hands of the real Captain America in Secret Empire, Yelena began to reassume the Black Widow identity once again, but now to honor the late Natasha. Sometimes during the world's restoration from Hydra's mess, Yelena travels around the world to assassinate the world's infamous generals and Hydra's remnants, which caught the attentions of Natasha's former lovers Winter Soldier and Hawkeye.

Powers and abilities
Black Widow is in peak athletic condition. She also has extensive military, gymnastics, martial arts, and espionage training.

As a Super-Adaptoid, she was mutated by material synthesized from the Super-Adaptoid where she could adapt the powers of anyone around her like Luke Cage, Iron Man, Ms. Marvel, Sentry, Spider-Man, Spider-Woman, and Wolverine in rapid succession.

Reception

Accolades 

 In 2019, CBR.com ranked Yelena Belova 7th in their "10 Most Powerful Russians In Comics" list.
 In 2020, Scary Mommy included Yelena Belova in their "Looking For A Role Model? These 195+ Marvel Female Characters Are Truly Heroic" list.
 In 2021, Screen Rant included Yelena Belova in their "10 Best Versions Of Black Widow From Marvel Comics" list and in their "Red Room's Most Powerful Members" list.

In other media

Television
Yelena Belova appears in Avengers Assemble, voiced by Julie Nathanson. This version is the second incarnation of the Black Widow following Baron Strucker reactivating the Red Room program and is the self-proclaimed rival of Natasha Romanoff. In season four, she rechristens herself the Crimson Widow and becomes a Hydra agent.

Marvel Cinematic Universe

Yelena Belova appears in media set in the Marvel Cinematic Universe, portrayed by Florence Pugh. This version is a sister to Natasha Romanoff, and was trained to be a Black Widow alongside her in the Red Room.
 Pugh first appears in the live-action film Black Widow (2021). Director Cate Shortland said that Romanoff would be "handing [Belova] the baton" in the film, which would "propel another female storyline". Scarlett Johansson, who portrays Romanoff, said Belova would stand on her own in comparison to Romanoff, while Pugh said there was a "generational difference" between the two, noting, Belova is "unapologetic, and confident in herself, and curious ... and emotionally brave". Additionally, Pugh stated Belova "knows exactly how to function in the areas in which she has been trained, but she has no clue how to live as a human being," calling her "a lethal weapon but also a bit of a kid". Yelena was originally going to be an adversary of Natasha and Yelena was trying to dethrone her. Violet McGraw portrays a young Yelena.
 Pugh reprises her role in the live-action Disney+ miniseries Hawkeye (2021).
 An alternate timeline version of Belova will appear in the upcoming animated series Marvel Zombies.
 Pugh will reprise her role in the upcoming live-action film Thunderbolts (2024).

Video games
 Yelena Belova's Black Widow suit appears as an alternate costume for Natasha Romanoff / Black Widow in the PlayStation Portable version of Marvel Ultimate Alliance and Marvel Heroes.
 Yelena Belova appears in The Punisher: No Mercy. This version is a member of a S.H.I.E.L.D.
 Yelena Belova / Dark Widow appears as a miniboss in Marvel Avengers Alliance.
 Yelena Belova appears as a mini-boss and unlockable playable character in Marvel Puzzle Quest, with the MCU incarnation being added in a later update.
 Yelena Belova / Black Widow appears as a playable character in Marvel Contest of Champions as part of the Black Widow film tie-in update.
 Yelena Belova / Black Widow appears as a playable character in Marvel Future Fight as part of the Black Widow film tie-in update.

Miscellaneous
 Yelena Belova appears in Marvel Knights - Spider-Woman: Agent of S.W.O.R.D., voiced JoEllen Anklam.
 Yelena Belova appears in Marvel Knights: Inhumans, voiced by Sarah Edmondson.
 Yelena Belova appears in New Avengers: Breakout, written by Alisa Kwitney. This version is Natasha Romanoff's former friend and roommate from the Red Room program who becomes a member of a rogue S.H.I.E.L.D. faction.
 A future version of Yelena Belova from a version of the Old Man Logan timeline appears in Marvel's Wastelanders, voiced by Eva Amurri. This version uses the alias of Samantha Sugarman.

References

External links
 Yelena Belova at Marvel.com
 Yelena Belova at the Marvel Directory
 Yelena Belova at the Appendix to the Handbook of the Marvel Universe
 

Black Widow (Marvel Comics)
Comics characters introduced in 1999
Fictional asexuals
Fictional female assassins
Fictional assassins in comics
Fictional female secret agents and spies
Fictional Russian people
Fictional special forces personnel
Fictional women soldiers and warriors
Marvel Comics female supervillains
Marvel Comics martial artists
Marvel Comics LGBT supervillains
Marvel Comics titles
S.H.I.E.L.D. agents
Marvel Comics film characters